Daqdaqabad (also Romanized as Dāqdāqābād) is a village in Hajjilu Rural District, in the Central District of Kabudarahang County, Hamadan Province, Iran. At the 2006 census, its population was 4,879, in 1,174 families.

References 

Populated places in Kabudarahang County